Glenada may refer to:
 MV Glenada, a tugboat, built for the Royal Canadian Navy, then active for decades as a civilian vessel
 SS Glenada, a steamboat, built in 1904, that operated on the Magnetawan River, in Ontario
 Glenada, Oregon